The 1977 Primera División season was the 86th season of top-flight football in Argentina. River Plate won the Metropolitano (17th title) and Independiente achieved the Nacional championship (11th title).

Lanús, Ferro C. Oeste and Temperley were relegated.

Metropolitano Championship

Nacional Championship

Group A

Group B

Group C

Group D

Semifinals

Final

Independiente won on away goals rule

First leg

Second leg

References

Argentine Primera División seasons
p
Primera Division
Arg